Blank Screens is the second full-length release from Vermont band The Static Age. It was released on September 16th, 2006 via ReIgnition Recordings and was produced by Michael Birnbaum and Chris Bittner.

Track listing
 "Blank Screens" – 4:15
 "Skyscrapers" – 3:04
 "Lights in the Attic" – 3:46
 "Trauma" – 3:57
 "Cherry Red" – 3:16
 "The Bluebird Room" – 4:22
 "Count the Dead" – 3:51
 "Marilyn" – 4:29
 "The Last Light in the West" – 7:14
 "Trauma (Remixed by The Static Age and Ocelot Mthrfckrs)" - 5:29 (iTunes digital exclusive)

Personnel
Andrew Paley - Vocals, Guitar, Keyboards
Adam Meilleur - Bass
Tim Alek Mulley - Drums
Sarah-Rose Cameron - Keyboards

References

The Static Age albums
2006 albums